The 1987–88 FC Bayern Munich season was the 88th season in the club's history and 23rd season since promotion from Regionalliga Süd in 1965. Bayern Munich finished as runner-up in the Bundesliga to SV Werder Bremen. The club reached the quarterfinals of both the DFB-Pokal and the European Cup.  The inaugural DFB-Supercup was won by Bayern Munich over Hamburger SV. This season was the first season under manager Jupp Heynckes, who replaced Udo Lattek.

Results

Friendlies

Fuji-Cup

Joan Gamper Trophy

Bundesliga

Results by round

League standings

DFB Pokal

DFB-Supercup

European Cup

1st round

2nd round

Quarterfinals

Team statistics

Players

Squad, appearances and goals

|-
|colspan="12"|Players sold or loaned out after the start of the season:

|}

Bookings

Transfers

In

Out

References

FC Bayern Munich seasons
Bayern